The following is a list of some notable Old Bedford Modernians who are former pupils of Bedford Modern School in Bedford, England.  At the school, alumni are known as OBMs.  The Old Bedford Modernians' Club was founded in 1892.

Academia

 Sir William Augustus Tilden FRS (1842–1926), Chemist & Dean, Royal College of Science, London
 Professor Joseph Reynolds Green FRS FLS (1848–1914), Professor of Botany to the Pharmaceutical Society of Great Britain
 Professor William Hillhouse FLS (1850–1910), first Professor of Botany at the University of Birmingham
 Edward Mann Langley (1851–1933), founded the Mathematical Gazette, created Langley's Adventitious Angles
 William Robert Bousfield FRS (1854–1943), chemist
 Professor John Holland Rose FBA (1855–1942), Vere Harmsworth Professor of Imperial and Naval History, University of Cambridge
 George Charles Crick FGS FRGS FZS (1856–1917), geologist, authority on Cephalopoda, 1st Assistant at the Natural History Museum
 Arthur John Pressland FRSE (1865 –1934), educational theorist, linguist, schoolmaster and writer
 George James Gibbs FRAS (1866–1947), astronomer, engineer, inventor and public science lecturer
 Professor Richard John Durley MBE (1868–1948), Professor of Mechanical Engineering at McGill University (1901–12)
 Edward Augustine Lowe Laxton MBE (1869–1951), expert on fruit production (Laxton's Superb)
 Professor Henry Payne FRAeS M.Inst.C.E. (1871–1945), Professor of Engineering at the University of Melbourne
 Jannion Steele Elliott (1871–1942), ornithologist
 Dr Eric Temple Bell (1883–1960), mathematician who specialised in number theory and formulated the Bell series
 Sir Charles Oatley OBE FRS FREng (1904–1996), pioneered the development of the scanning electron microscope
 Dr. G. C. Dunning D.Lit FSA (1905–1978), pioneering medieval archaeologist, authority on Anglo-Saxon and medieval ceramics
 Professor William Francis Grimes CBE (1905–1988), Professor of Archaeology, University of London (1956–1973)
 Reverend Francis MacCarthy Willis Bund (1906–1980), Chaplain, Dean and Fellow of Balliol College, Oxford
 Dr D. C. Riddy CBE (1907–1979), Controller-General of the Education Branch, Control Commission for German – British Element
 F. G. Emmison MBE FSA FRHistS (1907–1995), archivist, author and historian
 Professor John Roach (1920 – 2015), historian
 Professor Ramsay Shearman DSc FReng FIET FRMetS FIEEE (1924-2019), pioneer in shortwave radio and radar
 Professor Brian Glüss FRSS (1930–2013), statistician, mathematician, systems engineer, author and expert on survivor guilt
 Professor John Richard Anthony Pearson FRS FIMMM MIChemE (born 1930), pioneer in fluid mechanics
 Professor David John Bartholomew FBA (1931-2017), Professor of Statistics at the LSE (1973–96)
 Professor Philip Bean (born 1936), Professor of Criminology at Loughborough University, former President of the British Soc. of Criminology
 Professor George Richard Pickett FRS (born 1939), Professor of Low Temperature Physics at Lancaster University
 Professor Sid Gray PhD FASSA FCCA (born 1942), Professor at the University of Sydney Business School
 Professor Richard Hugh Britnell FBA (1944–2013), Professor of History at Durham University
 Sir Peter Knight FRS (born 1947), Professor of quantum optics at Imperial College London
 Professor Stephen Wildman (born 1951), Professor of the History of Art at Lancaster University
 Dr. Roger Geoffrey Clarke (1952–2007), ornithologist, world authority on harriers and other birds of prey
 Professor Barry H.V. Topping MBCS MICE MIStructE MIMechE FIMA (born 1952), authority and author on computational mechanics
 Professor Stephen Taylor (born 1953), Professor of Finance at Lancaster University
 Professor Richard Charles Murray Janko (born 1955), Professor of Classical Studies at the University of Michigan
 Professor Brian Derby FIMMM (born 1956), Professor of Materials science at Manchester University
 Professor Gavin D'Costa (born 1958), Professor in Catholic Theology at the University of Bristol
 Professor Nick Groom FRSA (born 1966), Professor of English Literature at the University of Macau and author
 Professor Tony Claydon (born 1967), Professor of Early Modern History at Bangor University, Wales
 Dr Peter David Wothers MBE FRSC (born 1969), chemist and Fellow of St Catharine's College, Cambridge
 Professor Ben McFarlane (born 1976), Professor of English Law at the University of Oxford

Actors, directors and entertainers

 E. E. Blake (1879–1961), pioneering exhibitor of motion pictures and owner of cinemas
 Harrish Ingraham (1881–?), Hollywood film director, writer and actor in the era of silent movies
 Gillie Potter (1887–1975), comedian and broadcaster
 Reginald Berkeley (1890–1935), playwright and screenwriter in Hollywood (Cavalcade, The World Moves On)
 Robert Luff CBE (1914–2009), theatrical agent and producer (The Black and White Minstrel Show)
 Derek Scott (1921–2006), double act (with Terry-Thomas and Tony Hancock) and music director (The Muppet Show)
 David Tringham (born 1935), assistant film director (Lawrence of Arabia, Highlander, Robin Hood: Prince of Thieves)
 Hugh Armstrong (1944-2016), actor (How to Get Ahead in Advertising, Death Line)
 David Firth (born 1945), actor (Casualty, Midsomer Murders), screenwriter (Home James!), singer (original cast of Phantom of the Opera) 
 John Sessions (1953–2020), actor (Gangs of New York, The Iron Lady, Filth), comedian and broadcaster (QI)
 Julian Hector (born 1960), Head of the BBC Natural History Unit
 Saul Nassé (born 1965), producer for the BBC (Tomorrow's World)
 Russell Barnes (born 1968), television producer (The Enemies of Reason, The Genius of Charles Darwin)
 David Jubb (born 1970), theatre director and chief executive of the Battersea Arts Centre
 Russell Howard (born 1980), comedian and presenter (Russell Howard's Good News)
 Leon Parris (born 1981), writer, composer, musician and actor (Wolfboy)
 Jeremy Irvine (born 1990), UK and Hollywood actor (War Horse, Now Is Good, Great Expectations, The Railway Man)
 Sope Dirisu (born 1991), stage, television and film actor
 Suhani Gandhi (born 1994), model and actress

Adventurers, aviators, exiles and prisoners of war

 John Percy Farrar DSO FGS (1857–1929), mountaineer, President of the Alpine Club, Member of the Mount Everest Committee
 Sir Reginald Wolseley, 10th Baronet (1872–1933), dubbed the elevator baronet
 Captain and Bimbashi Henry Haymes SBStJ MRCS LRCP (1872–1904), surgeon, an original explorer of the Bahr-el-Ghazal
 George E.M. Kelly (1878–1911), early aviator in the Aeronautical Division, US Signal Corps 
 Captain Aeneas Lionel Acton Mackintosh (1879–1916), Antarctic explorer, commander of the Ross Sea party expedition
 W.A.B. Goodall (1880–1941), castaway, described as 'the ruler of the world's tiniest kingdom': Pulau Sarimbun, Straits of Johore 
 Duncan Mackintosh, 31st Chattan (1884–1966), 31st Chief of Clan Chattan (1942–66)
 Wilfrid Thomas Reid FRAeS (1887–1968), aircraft designer and pioneer of the Canadian aircraft industry
 P.C.B. Newington (1888–1964), author of a cookbook celebrating Malaysian food, conceived while starving as a prisoner of war
 Frederick Williamson CIE (1891–1935), explorer, founder member of the Himalayan Club
 Captain Richard 'Dick' Howe MBE MC (1916–1981), Escape Officer at Colditz Castle during World War II (1942–1945)
 Desmond 'Dizzy' de Villiers AFC (1922–1976), chief test pilot at de Havilland and English Electric

Architecture, art and design

 Josiah Conder (1852–1920), architect who designed the Rokumeikan and other public buildings in Tokyo
 Henry John Sylvester Stannard RBA FRSA (1870–1951), watercolour artist
Sydney Morgan Eveleigh (1870-1947), architect in Vancouver
 Major Hugh Patrick Guarin Maule DSO MC FRIBA (1873–1940), architect (Royal Veterinary College in London)
 George Loraine Stampa (1875–1951), artist, contributor to Punch and other illustrated papers and magazines
 Walter Stonebridge FRIBA (1879–1962), Diocesan Architect for Ely, St Albans and Bedford
 Algernon Winter Rose MC (1885–1918), architect
 Kenneth Alexander (1887–1975), photographer for United Artists, Samuel Goldwyn Productions and 20th Century Studios
 Robert Tor Russell CIE DSO (1888–1972), Chief Architect to the Government of India
 Thomas Francis Ford FRIBA (1891–1971), Diocesan Architect for Southwark and a translator of the New Testament
 Alexander Girard (1907–1993), textile designer and interior architect
 Victor Farrar RIBA PPFAS FRSA (1930–2007), architect 
 Dennis Sharp (1933–2010), architect, professor, curator, historian, author and editor
 Peter Forster (1935–2021), wood engraver
 Steve Gibbons (born 1956), graphic designer
 Alex Chinneck MRSS (born 1984), installation artist

Armed forces

Air Force
 Wing Commander George Marshall Griffith (1877–1946), Commandant of the Royal Flying Corps in India
 Brigadier-General Percy Robert Clifford Groves CB CMG DSO (1878–1959), Air Strategist
 Air Vice-Marshal Robert Dickinson Oxland CB CBE (1889–1959), Group Commander in Bomber Command (1943–44)
 Air Commodore Edye Rolleston Manning CBE DSO MC (1889–1957), senior officer in the Royal Air Force
 Air Commodore Charles Henry Elliott-Smith AFC (1889–1994), senior officer in the Royal Air Force
 Major H.D. Harvey-Kelly DSO (1891–1917), Squadron Commander, Royal Flying Corps
 Captain John Ellis Langford Hunter DSC DFC (1897–1971), World War I flying ace
 Group Captain Robert Cecil Dawkins CBE (1903-1985), Station Commander at RAF Tengah and RAF Hendon
 Air Commodore I. J. Fitch (1903–1944), deputy director of Intelligence at the Air Ministry
 Wing Commander Ernest Leslie 'Johnny' Hyde DFC (1914–1942), senior officer in the Royal Air Force
 Squadron Leader Roland Anthony 'Tony' Lee Knight DFC (1917–1941), World War II flying ace

Army
 Major-General Francis John Fowler CB DSO (1864–1939) Commander of the Derajat Brigade (1914–16)
 Major-General Charles Astley Fowler CB CSI DSO (1865–1940), Brigade Commander at the Battle of Loos, 1915
 Brigadier-General Sir Arthur Long KBE CB CMG DSO (1866–1941), Director of Transport and Supplies, Macedonia and The Black Sea
 Colonel Reginald Ruston CB (1867–1963), commander of the Mounted infantry of the Devon Regiment (1891–1903)
 Major R.T. Anwyl-Passingham OBE DL JP (1867–1926), Commander of the 72nd Punjabis, High Sheriff of Merionethshire
 Lieutenant-General Gerald Robert Poole CB CMG DSO (1868–1937), Commandant of the Royal Marine Artillery
 Lt.-Col. Charles Forbes Buchan CBE OStJ (1869-1954), Deputy Assistant Director at the War Office during WW1
 Colonel Ernest Clive Atkins CB TD DL JP (1870–1953), Commander of the 2/5th Leicestershire Regiment, High Sheriff of Leicestershire
 Lt.-Col. Robert Haymes DSO (1870–1942), first to establish an OP at the Battle of Neuve Chapelle 
 Lt.-Col. C. A. Keatinge Johnson (1870–1937), senior officer in the First Australian Imperial Force
 Major-General Herbert William Jackson CB CSI DSO (1872–1940), Officer of the British Indian Army
 Major George Godfrey Massy Wheeler VC (1873–1915), was a recipient of the Victoria Cross
 Lt.-Col. Arthur Charles Rothery Nutt DSO (1873–1946), inventor of the artillery miniature range
 Lt.-Col. R. E. Power DSO (1874–1956), Commander of the 1st and 2nd Battalion of the Buffs
 Major-General Charles Howard Foulkes CB CMG DSO (1875–1969), Britain's chief adviser on gas warfare
 Brigadier-General Herbert Cecil Potter CB CMG DSO (1875–1964)
 Lieutenant Charles Carroll Wood (1876–1899), first Canadian born Officer to die in the Second Boer War
 Colonel Charles Temple Morris CBE (1876–1956), Commander of the 5th Battalion of the 1st Punjab Regiment between 1921 and 1926
 Lt.-Col. James Knox DSO&bar (1878–1918), Battalion Commander, Royal Warwickshire Regiment, 1915–18
 Brigadier-General Herbert Dobbin CBE DSO (1878–1946), Colonel-Commandant, Iraq Levies, the Duke of Cornwall's Light Infantry
 Brigadier-General Arthur Turner CB CMG DSO (1878–1952), Cricketer, rugby union player and soldier
 Colonel Wilfrid Stanley Richmond CMG MICE (1881–1962), deputy director of Roads in the BEF during World War I
 Lt.-Col. Henry Cecil Prescott CMG CIE (1882–1960), Inspector of Police in Iraq
 Colonel Guy Sutton Bocquet CIE VD FRSA (1882–1961), ADC to the Viceroy of India
 Lt.-Col. Archibald Alderman Chase DSO (1884–1917), Commander of the 8th Battalion of the Royal Sussex Regiment
 Brigadier Harold Evelyn William Bell Kingsley CIE DSO (1885–1970), Aide-de-Camp to King George VI
 Lt.-Col. Charles Harvey-Kelly DSO (1885–1982), Military Attache in Kabul (1924-6)
 Lieutenant-General Reginald Dawson Hopcraft Lough DSO OBE (1886–1958), Aide-de-camp to King George VI
 Lt.-Col. A.E.F. Fawcus DSO MC TD (1886–1936), Commander, 1/5th North Staffordshire Regiment, 1/5th Sherwood Foresters
 Lt.-Col. W. F. Jackson OBE MC&Bar TD (1886–1964), Signals Liaison Officer to the US Army HQ in the UK during World War II
 Major George Croxton Walker OBE MC TD (1888–1936)
 Major Edward Crozier Creasy (1888–1936), senior liaison Officer during the Upper Silesia Plebiscite (1920–21)
 Captain Wynn Bagnall MC (1890–1931), Canadian Field Artillery, model for a statue by James Fraser in Winnipeg, Manitoba
 Lt.-Col. Melville Ten Broeke MC&bar (1891–1963), commander of Princess Patricia's Canadian Light Infantry Regiment
 Major-General L.A. Hawes CBE DSO MC DL (1892–1986), Commanded the transport to France of the BEF during World War I
 Brigadier W.C.V. Galwey OBE MC&bar (1897–1977), Senior Officer who served in World War I and World War II
 Col. F. H. Willasey Wilsey MC (1898–1971), Senior Liaison Officer to the Afghan delegation during the coronation of Queen Elizabeth II
 Brigadier Ernest Dynes CBE (1903–1968), Aide-de-camp to HM Queen Elizabeth II (1955–57)
 Brigadier Thomas Henry Scott Galletly DSO&bar MC (1905–1972), Commander of the 1st Brigade, Arab League
 Major Colin Leo Bliss (1907–1944), pioneer of operational parachuting
 Major-General Reginald Booth Stockdale CB CMG OBE (1908–1979) Colonel Commandant, REME
 Lt.-Col. Edward Peter Fletcher Boughey OBE (1911–1986), Special Operations Executive
 Major-General Keith Burch CB CBE (1931–2013)

Navy
 Commander Willoughby Huddleston CMG (1866–1953), ADC to Lord Pentland, Governor of Madras (1912–19)
 Captain Thomas Oloff de Wet CBE (1869–1940), Principal Naval Transport Officer during the evacuation of Constantinople in 1923
 Rear Admiral Alfred Ransom CBE (1871–1953), senior officer in the Royal Navy
 Sir Ernest Whiteside Huddleston CIE CBE RIN (1874–1959), Aide-de-camp to the Viceroy of India
 Captain Francis Walter Despard Twigg OBE (1883-1951), senior officer in the Royal Navy
 Commander Herbert Newton OBE DL (1900–1973), Royal Navy Commander and Deputy Lieutenant of Bedfordshire
 Rear-Admiral Jack Kenneth Highton CB CBE (1904–1988), Aide-de-camp to Queen Elizabeth II
 Captain Frederick Stovin-Bradford CBE DSC&Bar (1919–1974), Royal Navy Commander (Fleet Air Arm)
 Vice-Admiral Sir Ted Horlick KBE (born 1925), Director General of British Ships (1979–83), Chief Naval Engineer Officer (1981–83)

Industry and commerce

 John Howard (1791–1878), industrialist, inventor of agricultural equipment and four times Mayor of Bedford
 James Howard (1821–1889), industrialist and inventor of agricultural equipment. MP for Bedford
 Sir Frederick Howard DL JP (1828–1915), industrialist
 Captain Charles Wells (1842–1914), founder of Charles Wells Ltd, progenitor of the Wells baronets of Felmersham
 Sir George Farrar, 1st Baronet (1859–1915), mining magnate, politician and soldier
 Lt. Col. Henry Batten Huddleston OBE VD (1864–1944), Chief Agent and later a Director of the Burma Railways
 Hon. Walter Nutt OBE (1874–1940), managing director of The Straits Trading Company (1918–21)
 Sir Noel Mobbs KCVO OBE (1878–1959), founder of Slough Estates and High sheriff of Buckinghamshire
 E. E. Blake (1879–1961), Chairman of Kodak UK
E. E. Cammack AIA FAIA FCAS (1881–1958), prominent actuary in the USA
 William Pickwoad OBE FRSA (1886–1975), prominent in South America's railway industry. Founding director of the Central Bank of Bolivia 
 W. T. Godber CBE (1904–1981), authority on agriculture and agricultural engineering
 Sir Henry Cecil Johnson KBE (1906–1988), chairman of the British Railways Board (1968–71)
 Alastair George MacKenzie CBE MC (1915–1989), prominent figure in South East Asian insurance during the 1960s and 1970s
 Francis Coulson MBE (1919–1998), chef and hotelier
 Edward Roy Kent CBE (1920–2009), estate owner and agriculturalist in the Caribbean
 Lt.-Col. Ray Daniels MC (1923–2003), Chief Executive of the William Press Group
 Max Wideman (born 1927), expert in project management
 Sir Anthony Hartwell, 6th Baronet (born 1940), Master mariner and Marine surveyor
 John Quenby (born 1941), Chief Executive of the RAC Motor Sports Association (1990–2001)
 Andrew Stuart Winckler (1949–2007), Chief Executive of the Financial Services Authority (1996–98)
 Adrian Penfold OBE MRTPI FRSA (born 1952), Head of Planning at British Land, adviser to the UK Government
 Graham Clive Watts OBE MCMI FRSA FRIBA (born 1956), Chief Executive of the Construction Industry Council
 Richard Bradbury CBE (born 1956), Chief Executive of River Island (2008–11), director of Boden (2012–)
 Angus Knowles-Cutler (born 1962), senior partner at Deloitte
 Steve Melton (born 1962), Chief Executive of Exemplar Health Care
 Nick Blofeld (born 1964), managing director of Epsom Downs Racecourse (2007–09), Chief Executive of Bath Rugby (2009–14)
 Marcus Weldon (born 1968), 13th President of Bell Labs
 Johnny Luk MRSA (born 1991), entrepreneur and Conservative Party candidate

Journalism

 William Fairbridge JP (1863–1943), founder of the Rhodesia Herald and the Bulawayo Chronicle, first mayor of Salisbury
 Leonard Dudeney (1875–1956), newspaper editor (North China Daily News) and parliamentary correspondent (Daily Express and Daily Sketch)
 Albert Powtrill Ager (1876–1956), editor, manager and publisher of The Straits Times
 Gaston Hanet Archambault (1877–1951), correspondent at The New York Times
 Lindsay Bashford OBE (1881–1921), Literary Editor of the Daily Mail
 Richard Capell OBE MM (1885–1954), music critic for the Daily Mail (1911–33) and the Daily Telegraph (1933–54)
 George Matthews (1917–2005), leading communist and editor of the Daily Worker/Morning Star from 1959 to 1974
 Eric Litchfield (1920–1982), sports editor of The Rand Daily Mail (1956–1970), the Cape Times (1970–82) and author
 Jon Akass (1933–1990), Fleet Street columnist
 Sir Nicholas Lloyd (born 1942), newspaper editor, News of the World (1984) and the Daily Express (1986–95)
 Michael Toner (born 1944), leader writer at the Sunday Express and Daily Mail. Author and novelist
 Christopher Wilson (born 1947), journalist and Royal biographer
 Nicholas Shaxson (born 1966), author, journalist and associate fellow of Chatham House
 Ben Anderson (born 1975), television reporter and writer (Holidays in the Axis of Evil)

Law

 Alfred Clare (1851–1912), District Registrar of the High Court of Justice
 William Robert Bousfield KC FRS (1854–1943), expert on patent law
 Sir William Tudball (1866–1943). Puisne judge of the High Court of Allahabad (1909–1922)
 Sir Sidney Abrahams KC (1885–1957), Chief Justice of Tanganyika and Ceylon
 Sir Clement Thornton Hallam (1891–1965), Solicitor to the General Post Office
 Dr James Mould QC (1893–1958), Queen's Counsel, Bencher of Gray's Inn and a Fellow of University College London
 Rowland Thomas Lovell Lee (1920–2005), Recorder of the Crown Court (1979–92)
 Stephen John Wooler CB (born 1948), HM Chief Inspector to the Crown Prosecution Service (1999–2010)
 Nicholas Stewart KC (born 1947), King's Counsel, Bencher of the Inner Temple and Deputy High Court Judge
 Hon. Tim Lord KC (born 1966), King's Counsel and Bencher of the Inner Temple

Literature

 William Hale White (1831–1913), author known by his pseudonym Mark Rutherford
 Neil Wynn Williams (1864–1940), novelist, writer and contributor of short stories and articles to periodicals and journals
 George Moreby Acklom (1870–1959), writer, literary editor of E.P. Dutton, father of the Hollywood actor David Manners
 Sir Henry Howarth Bashford (1880–1961), author of Augustus Carp, Esq. and several other satirical novels
 Eric Temple Bell, (1883–1960), science fiction author (as John Taine)
 David Scott Daniell (1906–1965), author, playwright and regimental historian
 Christopher Fry (1907–2005), poet and playwright. Awarded the Queen's Gold Medal for Poetry in 1962
 Gordon Thomas (1933–2017), investigative journalist and author (Gideon's Spies, The Pope's Jews)
 John Andrews (born 1936), author and antiques writer
 David Morse (born 1938), author on Motown, Romanticism and the Victorian era
 Russell Ash (1946–2010), author (The Top 10 of Everything)
 S.I. Martin (born 1961), author, historian and journalist specialising in Black British history and literature
 Stephen May (born 1964), novelist, playwright and TV writer
 Toby Litt (born 1968), author (Beatniks, Corpsing, Finding Myself, Journey into Space)

Medicine

 Samuel Hoppus Adams MRCS MD MB (1835–1895), surgeon and physician
 George Cleghorn (1850–1902), President of the New Zealand Medical Association
 Walter Jessop FRCS (1853–1917), Ophthalmic Surgeon at St Bartholomew's, President of the UK Ophthalmological Society
 Major-General Harold Percy Waller Barrow CB CMG OBE DSO (1856–1957), Honorary Surgeon to King George V
 Major-General George Francis Angelo Harris CSI FRCP (1856–1931), Honorary Surgeon to King George V and the Viceroy of India
 Rickard William Lloyd MRCS LRCPEd (1859–1933), Consulting Anaesthetist and author
 Charles Hubert Roberts FRCS FRCP (1865–1929), Obstetrician and Gynaecologist
 Claud Alley Worth FRCS (1869–1936), ophthalmologist, inventor of the Worth 4 dot test and Worth's Ambyloscope, world authority on squint
 Frank Atcherley Rose FRCS (1873–1935), surgeon at St Bartholomew's Hospital (1928–31)
 Thomas Shepherd Novis FRCS (1874–1962), Professor of Surgery at Grant Medical College, Bombay
 Major-General Harold Rothery Nutt FRCS (1876–1953), Honorary Surgeon to King George V and the Viceroy of India
 Cyril Arthur Bennett Horsford FRCS (1876–1953), Laryngologist to the Royal College of Music
 John Wycliffe Linnell FRCP MC (1878–1967), Consulting Physician
 Sir Henry Howarth Bashford FRCP (1880–1961), Honorary Physician to King George VI
 Sir Adolphe Abrahams OBE FRCP (1883–1967), Olympic Medical Officer from 1912
 H. L. D. Kirkham (1887–1949), first Professor of Plastic Surgery at Baylor University, Texas, recipient of the US Legion of Merit
 Frank Cook FRCS FRCOG (1888–1972), Beit Fellow, obstetric and gynaecological surgeon
 Basil Laver MS FRCS (1894–1934), surgeon
 Arkyl Staveley Gough OBE OStJ FRCS (1900–1990), surgeon
 Professor Anthony Andreasen FRSE FRCSE FICS (1906–1986), surgeon to the Viceroy of India
 Sir George Edward Godber GCB (1908–2009), Chief Medical Officer for HM Government in England (1960–73)
 William Edward Lancaster CBE AM (1909–2003), Chief Executive of the Royal Zoological Society of South Australia
 Professor Joseph Graeme Humble CVO FRCP FRCPath (1913–1980), Professor of Haematology at Westminster Hospital
 Professor Ernest Cotchin FRCVS FRCPath (1917–1988), Professor of Veterinary Pathology at the Royal Veterinary College (1963-1982)
 Dr Richard Norman Smith FRCVS (1926–1988), President of the British Veterinary Association between 1975 and 1976.
 Professor Michael Tynan MD FRCP (born 1934), Professor of Paediatric Cardiology at Guy's Hospital (1982–99)
 Dr Vaughan Southgate OBE DL FZS FRSM FLS FSB (born 1944), parasitologist
 Professor John Clibbens FRSocMed (born 1953), Professor of Developmental Psychology at Birmingham City University
 Dr Harry Brünjes FRSocMed (born 1954), Chairman of Premier Medical Group
 Professor Mark Woodhead FRCP FERS (born 1954), world authority on lung infection and pneumonia
 Dr Ian Martin Wylie FRSM (born 1955), Chief Executive of the Royal College of Obstetricians and Gynaecologists
 Michael Trudgill FAsMA FRAeS (born 1966), Chief Medical Officer at the UK Civil Aviation Authority

Music

 Roland Bocquet (1878–1956), composer, Professor of Music Theory at Dresden Conservatory
 Cyril Gell ARCO LRAM FGSM (1909-1994), musician, conductor of the BBC Singers and former professor at the Guildhall School of Music
 Derek Scott (1921–2006), composer and music director for film and television (The Muppet Show)
 Gordon Langford (1930–2017), brass band and orchestral music composer, arranger and performer (Return of the Jedi, Superman II)
 Paul Paviour OAM FRCO (born 1931), composer, organist and conductor based in Australia
 Tim Souster (1943–1994), composer
 Justin Lavender (born 1951), operatic tenor and professor of vocal studies at the Royal College of Music
 Paul Christison Edwards (born 1955), organist and composer of music for the Anglican Church
 Nicholas Carthy (born 1957), Conductor of the Orchestra della Svizzera Italiana (1993–96), Professor of Music at the University of Colorado
 Michael Hext (born 1961), inaugural winner of the BBC Young Musician of the Year Competition
 Max Richter (born 1966), composer
 Don Broco, band
Segun Akinola (born 1993), composer and music director for film and television (Doctor Who)

Public office

Home
 James Howard (1821–1889), Liberal MP
 William Robert Bousfield KC FRS (1854–1943), Conservative MP
 Arthur Pedley CB (1859–1943), senior civil servant
 Arthur Sheppard MVO (1862–1944), Private Secretary to the Archbishop of Canterbury (1902–1928)
 Sir Archibald Dennis Flower (1865–1950). Chairman of the Trustees and Guardians of Shakespeare's birthplace
 Colonel John Alfred Lawrence Billingham CBE FRICS (1868–1955), Chief Inspector of Works, War Office (1928–33)
 Edmund Dene Morel (1873–1924), Labour MP
 Major F. R. Phipps OBE A.M. Inst. C.E. F.S.I. (1875–1927), Senior Engineering Inspector at the Ministry of Transport, 1924 to 1927
 Sir Ralph Endersby Harwood KCB KCVO CB CBE (1883–1951). Financial Secretary to three Kings (1935–37)
 Davenport Fabian Cartwright Blunt CB (1888–1965), Under-Secretary at HM Treasury (1946–48)
 Reginald Berkeley (1890–1935), Liberal MP
 Sir Laurence George Gale CB OBE (1905–1969). Controller, Royal Ordnance Factories
 Hugh Chaplin CB (1905–1996), Principal Keeper of Printed Books at the British Museum
 Jack Morton CMG OBE (1911–1985). Assistant Undersecretary of State at the Ministry of Defence (1968–71)
 Philip Lionel Burton CBE (1914–1996), Head of the Civil Service Pay Research Unit between 1963 and 1971
 Arthur Jones (1915–1991), Conservative MP. Mayor of Bedford
 Edgar William Boyles (1921–2001), Under-Secretary at the Inland Revenue (1975–81)
 Tony Hart CBE (1923–2009), leader of Kent C.C. during the development of the Channel Tunnel, Eurostar and the Dartford Bridge
 Colonel Brian Ernest Maitland Prophet OBE TD DL (1928–2004), Deputy Lieutenant of Bedfordshire
 Sir Stanley John Odell (1929-2021), former Chairman of the National Union of Conservative Constituency Associations
 Sir Keith Speed DL (1934-2018), Conservative MP. Undersecretary of State for Defence (1979–81)
 Jeffery John Mumford Speed CBE FRSA FInstLM FRGS (born 1936) was Director of Fundraising at Conservative Central Office
 Rev. Canon Jeffrey James West OBE FRSA (born 1950), Inspector of Historic Buildings, English Heritage (1983–86)
 Patrick Hall (born 1951), Labour MP
 Nick Hawkins, (born 1957), former Conservative MP
 Andrew Charles Gilchrist (born 1960), former General Secretary of the Fire Brigades Union
 Nicolas John "Nick" Gibb (born 1960), Conservative MP
 Richard Fuller (born 1962), Conservative MP
 Matt Cavanagh (born 1971), special adviser to New Labour (2003–2010)

Overseas
 Sir William Morgan KCMG (1828–1883), Premier of South Australia (1878–81)
 Hon. Arthur Carter (1847–1917), businessman, Australian Consul to Norway, Member of the Queensland Legislative Council
 Leonard Isitt (1855–1937), M.P. for the New Zealand Liberal Party and member of the New Zealand Legislative Council
 Charles Frederick Gale (1860–1928), senior Australian civil servant, Chief Protector of Aborigines in Western Australia
 C. W. P. Douglas de Fenzi (1863–1927), Clerk to the Legislative Council of Natal
 Henry George Graves ARSM (1864–1929), Controller of Patents and Designs in India between 1904 and 1919
 Sir Ernest Colville Collins Wilton KCMG (1870–1952), President of the Commission for the Government of the Saar Basin
 Herbert George Billson CIE (1871–1938), Chief Conservator of Indian Forests, 1922–26
 Sir William Pell Barton KCIE CSI (1871–1956), Resident in Baroda (1919), Mysore (1920–25) and Hyderabad (1925–30)
 William McKinnell (1873–1939), politician who served in the Legislative Assembly of Manitoba, Canada (1920–36)
 Hon. Walter Nutt OBE (1874–1940), a member of the Federal Malay States Legislative council
 John Richard Donovan Glascott CIE (1877–1938), Chief Engineer of the Burma Railways, Member of the Legislative Council of Burma
 Sir Robert Daniel Richmond CIE (1878–1948), Chief Conservator, Indian Woods and Forests
 Archie Rose CIE FRGS (1879–1961), diplomat, explorer and businessman in China
 John Mervyn Dallas Wrench CIE (1883–1961), Chief Engineer of the Great Indian Peninsular Railway
 Sir Francis Moncrieff Kerr-Jarrett (1885–1968), Custos Rotulorum of St James's, Jamaica
 Stanley Wyatt Smith (1887–1958), Consul-General of Manila (1938–42) and Honolulu (1943–44)
 Major-General Ronald Okeden Alexander CB DSO (1888–1949), Inspector General, Central Canada (1942–46)
 Charles Hawes CIE MC (1890–1963). Chief Engineer to the Government of Sind
 Frederick Williamson CIE (1891–1935), Consul-General of Kashgar (1927–30)
 Reginald Philip Abigail (1892–1969), District Commissioner of Arakan during the fall of Burma in 1942
 Hon. Robert Skinner MBE (1893–1969), Federal Treasurer of the Leeward Islands
 Bertram St. Leger Ten Broeke CIE MC (1895–1962), Deputy Inspector-General of the Indian Police in Bihar
 W. D. Harverson OBE ARSM MIMM (1903–92), Commissioner of Mines in Kenya (1949–58) and Tanganyika (1958–62)
 Walter Ian James Wallace CMG OBE (1905–1993), Assistant Undersecretary of State at the Colonial Office (1962–66)
 Sir Arthur Mooring KCMG (1908–1969), British Resident in Zanzibar (1959–1963)
 Cyril Herbert Williams CMG OBE (1908–1983), Provincial Commissioner of the Nyanza Province of Kenya (1951–56)
 Roger Tancred Robert Hawkins GLM ICD (1915–1980), Rhodesian politician and member of Ian Smith's cabinet after Rhodesia's UDI
 Victor Yarnell (1919–2005), American politician, Democratic Mayor of Reading, Pennsylvania (1968–1972)
 Colonel Ian Cook OBE (1934–1994), Commander of the Vanuatu Mobile Police Force (1980–84)
 Malcolm Geoffrey Hilson OBE (born 1942), High Commissioner of Vanuatu (1997–2000)
 Paul Reddicliffe OBE (born 1945), British Ambassador to the Kingdom of Cambodia (1994–1997)
 Michael Crowther (born 1952), CEO of the Indianapolis Zoo, founder of the Indianapolis Prize
 Yang Berbahagia Datuk Wira Dr. Mohamed Farid Md Rafik DCSM (1976–2019), Malaysian politician

Religion

 The Rt. Rev. William Toll (1843–1915), Suffragan bishop of the Episcopal Diocese of Chicago (1911–15)
 Canon Thomas Blyth DD (1844–1913), author and Commissary to the Archbishop of Ottawa and Bishops of Niagara
 The Rev. H.A. Lester MA (1873–1922), theologian, director of the Bishop of London's Sunday School Council (1911–1922)
 The Rev. Arthur Raley MC (1889-1964), Chaplain to Royal Air Force Command during World War II
 The Ven. Thomas Dix ARCO (1908-1985), Archdeacon of Zanzibar
 The Ven. Robert Brown MA (1914–2001), Archdeacon of Bedford (1974–79)
 The Rev. Noel Stanton (1926–2009), founder of the Jesus Army
 Dr Bryan W. Ball (born 1935), theologian, former President of the Seventh-day Adventist Church in the South Pacific
 Dennis Frederick Orme (born 1938), former leader of Unification Churches in England, theologian and author
 The Rt. Rev. Tony Robinson (born 1956), Bishop of Wakefield

Sport

Art
 George Loraine Stampa (1875–1951), participant in the art competition at the 1928 Summer Olympics

Athletics
 Thomas Edgar Hammond (1878–1945), track and field athlete who competed in the 1908 Summer Olympics
 Sir Sidney Abrahams KC (1885–1957), competed in the Long jump at the 1912 Summer Olympics
 Dr H.W. Evans MC (1890–1927), athlete, rugby player and physician
 Ken Richardson (1918–1998), athlete, silver medallist in the 1938 British Empire Games
 Julie Rogers (born 1998), participant in the 2012 Summer Paralympics and the 2016 Summer Paralympics

Chess
 Charles Blake (1880–1961), U.S. Open Chess Champion in 1911
 Harold James Plaskett (born 1960), British Chess Champion in 1990

Cricket

 Arthur Jones (1872–1914), Captained the England cricket team. Wisden Cricketer of the Year in 1900
 Lionel Brown (1872–1938), cricketer
 Arthur Jervois Turner (1878–1952), cricketer and rugby union player
 Sir Robert Daniel Richmond (1878–1948), played cricket for Jamaica
 Walter Martin Fitzherbert Turner (1881–1948), cricketer
 Arthur Cantrell (1883–1954), cricketer  
 Norman Oliver CavA (1886–1948), played cricket for Bedfordshire and Brazil
 Frederick Charles William Newman (1896–1966), cricketer
 Basil Rogers (1896–1975), cricketer
 Ernest Dynes CBE (1903–1968), cricketer
 Maurice Pugh OBE (1903–1986), cricketer
 Arthur Grenfell Coomb (born 1929), cricketer
 Bob Gale (1933–2018), cricketer
 Geoff Millman (1934–2005), England cricketer
 Graham Jarrett (1937–2004), cricketer
 Peter David Watts (born 1938), cricketer
 Peter Kippax (1940–2017), cricketer
 Andrew Curtis (born 1943), cricketer
 Alan Fordham (born 1964), cricketer
 Neil Stanley (born 1968), cricketer
 Andrew Trott (born 1968), cricketer
 Paul Owen (born 1969) played cricket for Canada
 Matthew White (born 1969), cricketer
 Kelvin Locke (born 1980), cricketer
 Oliver Clayson (born 1980), cricketer
 Jamie Wade (born 1981), cricketer
 Monty Panesar (born 1982), England cricketer. Wisden Cricketer of the Year in 2007
 Richard King (born 1984), cricketer
 Robin Kemp (born 1984), cricketer
 Matthew Taylor (born 1999), cricketer

Football
 James Oswald Anderson (1872–1932), footballer for Lomas Athletic Club and Argentina, cricketer for Hertfordshire
 Andrew Ralston (1880–1950), footballer (Spurs and Watford). FA administrator
 Eric Litchfield (1920–1982), footballer (Newcastle United F.C., Leeds United F.C.)
 Gordon Brice (1924–2003), cricketer and footballer (Luton Town, Wolverhampton Wanderers, Reading, Fulham)

Hockey
 Charles Howard Foulkes CB CMG DSO (1875–1969), field hockey player who competed in the 1908 Summer Olympics

Rallying
 Ian Mantle (1920–2010), engineer and rally driver

Rowing
 Sir Archibald Dennis Flower (1865–1950), rowed for Cambridge in the 1886 Boat Race
 William Mansfield Poole (1871–1946), rowed for Oxford in the 1891 Boat Race
 Sir George Edward Godber GCB (1908–2009), rowed for Oxford in the 1928 and 1929 Boat Races
 Tony Leadley (born 1928), rowed for the United Kingdom and for Cambridge in the 1953 Boat Race
 Peter Knapp (born 1949), rower who competed in the 1968 Summer Olympics
 John Yallop (born 1949), rower who won a silver medal at the 1976 Summer Olympics in Montreal
 Neil Keron (born 1953), rower who competed in the 1976 Summer Olympics
 Tim Foster MBE (born 1970), rower who won a Gold Medal at the 2000 Summer Olympics in Sydney
 David Gillard (born 1971), rowed for Great Britain and also for Cambridge in the 1991, 1992 and 1993 Boat Races
 Rod Chisholm (born 1974), rower who competed in the 2008 Summer Olympics and 2012 Summer Olympics

Rugby

 Horace William Finlinson (1871–1956), England Rugby International
 Wardlaw Brown Thomson (1871–1921), England Rugby International
 Lt.-Col. Edgar Mobbs DSO (1882–1917), England Rugby International, Captained England and Northampton
 Arthur Gilbert Bull (1890–1963), England Rugby International
 Dick Stafford (1893–1912), England Rugby International
 Harold Lindsay Vernon Day (1898–1972), England Rugby International who also played first class cricket for Hampshire
 G.T. 'Beef' Dancer (1911–1991), rugby player who participated in the 1938 British Lions tour to South Africa
 Dickie Jeeps CBE (1930-2016), England Rugby International, Captained England and the British Lions
 Lionel Edward Weston (born 1947), England Rugby International
 Mark Denney (born 1975), rugby union player as centre for Bristol, Castres and Wasps
 Henry Staff (born 1991), rugby union player who played for RFU Championship side, Bedford Blues

Rugby fives
 Matt Cavanagh (born 1971), Rugby fives British champion in 2004 and 2006

Swimming
 Hamilton ("Tony") Pierre Matt Milton (born 1938), swimmer at the 1960 Summer Olympics

Notes

References

Bedford Modernian
People educated at Bedford Modern School
Bedfordshire-related lists